Portrait Gallery is the fifth studio album by the American singer-songwriter Harry Chapin, released in 1975.

History 

An early version of "Someone Keeps Calling My Name", done in a folk-rock vein reminiscent of The Byrds, appeared on the obscure 1966 album Chapin recorded with his brothers, Chapin Music!. The main guitar riff (and entire arrangement) in this version is strikingly similar to The Blue Things' equally obscure 1966 track "Doll House." Another version of the song was recorded for the 1972 album Sniper and Other Love Songs under the title of "City Sweet", but didn't make the final cut. It was later released in 2004 on the Heads & Tales / Sniper & Other Love Songs CD compilation.

The album artwork was designed and illustrated by Milton Glaser.

Record World said the single "Tangled Up Puppet "shows the lyricist at his incisive best."

Track listing

Personnel

Harry Chapin - guitar, vocals
Murray Adler - violin
Ron Bacchiocchi - synthesiser, percussion
Ed Bednarski - clarinet
Gene Bianco - harmonica
George Bohanon - trombone
Bud Brisbois - trumpet
Steve Chapin - piano, clavinet, vocals
Tom Chapin - vocals
Rita Coolidge - vocals
Assa Drori - violin
Jesse Ehrlich - cello
Joan Fishman - vocals
Joe Flood - vocals
Ronald Folsom - violin
James Getzoff - violin
Jeff Gross - vocals
Jim Horn - saxophone
Paul Hubinon - trumpet
Bill Hymanson - strings
Armand Kaproff - cello
Jackie Kelso - saxophone
David Kondziela - vocals
Kris Kristofferson - vocals
Paul Leka - piano, celeste, harpsichord
Jonathan B. Lindle - vocals
Betty MacIver - vocals
Pete MacIver - vocals
Michael Masters - cello
Marti McCall - vocals
Jay Migliori - saxophone, flute
Tim Moore - keyboards, clavinet
Todd Mulder - vocals
Alexander Neiman - viola
Gareth Nuttycombe - viola
Ronald Palmer - guitar, vocals
Geoff Parker - vocals, choir, chorus
Judi Parker - vocals
Don Payne - bass
Donald Peake - synthesizer
Stanley Plummer - violin
Katherine Anne Porter - vocals
Frank Porto - accordion
Kathy Ramos - vocals
Henry Roth - violin
Allan Schwartzberg - drums
Tim Scott - cello
Jack Shulman - violin
Frank Simms - vocals
George Simms - vocals
Ken Smith - flute, mandolin
Bob Springer - percussion
Billy Swan - vocals
John Tropea - guitar
Sheila Turner - vocals
Christopher Von Koschembahr - vocals
John Wallace - bass, vocals
Rob White - whistle
Susan White - vocals
Carolyn Willis - vocals

Charts

References

Harry Chapin albums
1975 albums
Albums produced by Paul Leka
Elektra Records albums
Albums with cover art by Milton Glaser